Waiye is a town in the Bari province of the autonomous Puntland region in northeastern Somalia. Waiye was proposed as a district by the Somali government in 1990, but because the town didn't go through the entire process, its designation as a district was pending. Following the establishment of Puntland government the town gained district status.

Overview
Waiye is situated in the Waiye District of the Bari province. Waiye has a number of academic institutions. In the Waiye District, there are ten primary schools, according to the Puntland Ministry of Education. Faruuq, Jurile, Khalid Binuwalid, and Waiye Primary are a few of these. Secondary schools in the area include Waiye Secondary.

Demographics
The broader Waiye district has roughly population of 23, 241 residents.

Notes

External links
 Waiye, Somalia

Bari, Somalia